Dogmatix is a fictional white terrier dog who is a companion to Obelix in the Asterix comics. Dogmatix is a pun on the words dog and dogmatic. In the original French, his name is Idéfix, itself a pun on the French expression idée fixe (fixed idea) meaning an obsession.

On January 6, 2021, it was announced that the character would have his own animated television series titled Idefix and the Indomitables.

Character synopsis
Dogmatix is the only animal among the main characters of the series.  His role is minor and funny in most of the stories, significant mainly as a 'bone' of contention between Asterix and Obelix as to whether he should be allowed to accompany them on their adventures. However, he is often seen doing something interesting in the background and occasionally fulfills an important part of the plot. In the words of the authors, Dogmatix is the only known "canine ecologist": he loves trees and howls in distress whenever one is damaged. Despite his small size, he is quite fearless. He has drunk the magic potion on a number of occasions, but his favourite treat is to 'chew a bone'.

A dog similar to Dogmatix appeared in page 28 of Asterix & the Golden Sickle. Dogmatix first appears in Asterix and the Banquet. Sitting outside a butcher's shop in Lutetia, he observes Asterix and Obelix go in. He then follows them all around Gaul, appearing in nearly every panel of the remainder of the story.  The two men do not notice him until the very end when he finally attracts Obelix's attention at the closing banquet and is given a pat on the head and a bone. He was meant to be a one-off character (hence his leaving the village in the final picture) but he was so effective it was decided to bring him back. Pilote, the magazine that published Asterix, held a contest to find a name for the dog. Hundreds of suggestions were received. The winning name, Idéfix, was submitted by Hervé Ambroise, Dominique and Anne Boucard, and Rémi Dujat.

In the next adventure, Asterix and Cleopatra, Dogmatix is given his name and plays a more active role. Asterix and Obelix argue about whether or not Dogmatix should accompany them to Egypt, but he proves his worth by following the Gauls into a pyramid in which they were lost and guiding them out safely.

Like many dogs, Dogmatix is protective of his master, especially when he falls for, or is shown affection by, beautiful young women. In Asterix the Legionary he makes clear his loathing for Panacea with whom Obelix had fallen in love. He shows the same attitude to Influenza in Asterix and Caesar's Gift and Melodrama in Asterix and the Great Divide. However, despite his loyalty to his master, Dogmatix has been shown to side with Asterix in arguments on various occasions, such as in Asterix and the Soothsayer and Obelix and Co.

His friendship with Pepe in Asterix in Spain  and Asterix in Corsica causes Obelix to become jealous. Likewise, Dogmatix is unimpressed by Obelix's attraction towards Panacea in the earlier stages of Asterix the Legionary and is hostile and growls when his master asks her to look after him while he is away. However, Panacea kisses him straightaway, putting him into a lovestruck daze.

Like the other villagers, he does not like Cacofonix and his only dialogue (in a thought bubble) is in Asterix and the Magic Carpet where he comments on Cacofonix's music skills, when Cacophonix was commenting on Wazizneim.

In Asterix and the Actress, he finds a mate and returns with a litter of puppies.

Dogmatix books

Dogmatix's great popularity gave rise to a line of children's books in 1973 featuring his "adventures".  These were in the form of text with illustrations and were not consistent with the Asterix stories.

  (Dogmatix the Athlete)
  (Dogmatix and the Little Girl)
  (Dogmatix at the Circus)
  (The Crazy Chase)
  (Dogmatix Makes a Friend)
  (Dogmatix and the Boar Hunt)
  (Dogmatix and the Storm)
  (The Well-Deserved Tea Party)
  (Dogmatix and the Baby) - not translated to English
  (Dogmatix and the Lost Fish)
  (Dogmatix's Birthday) - not translated  to English
  (Dogmatix in the Snow) - not translated to English
  (Dogmatix the Wizard) - not translated to English
  (Dogmatix and the Parrot)
  (Dogmatix and the Little Rabbit) - not translated to English

Although they carry the Goscinny/Uderzo byline, these are licensed works aimed at the children's market. They lack the style and sophistication of the main Asterix creative team, and have little or no editing for continuity. Although widely translated (not by the regular English translators of the Asterix comics), these comics did not become very popular and are mostly forgotten. The English editions of these works also contain many glaring mistakes. For example, the chief's wife is referred to as "Bacteria", while her usual name is Impedimenta; Bacteria is the name of Unhygenix’s wife.

In 1983, an attempt was made to revive the series with two new stories. These were translated by Derek Hockridge and Anthea Bell, the regular English language translators of the Asterix albums.

  (Dogmatix and the Ugly Little Eagle)
  (Dogmatix and the Magic Potions)

Comic albums
Idéfix et les Irréductibles
Pas de quartier pour le latin ! 2021.
Les Romains se prennent une gamelle ! 2022 June
 Ça balance pas mal à Lutèce ! 2022 October

References

Comics characters introduced in 1963
Fictional dogs
Asterix characters
Male characters in comics

de:Figuren aus Asterix#Idefix